The Dodge Slingshot (or Dodge Sling Shot) was a concept car created by Dodge. It was introduced at the 2004 New York International Auto Show. This car was built to be a car that was possibly targeted for a younger generation.

Specifications
The Slingshot has a rear-mounted, 3-cylinder, gasoline engine with normal aspiration and induction. The engine gives out a total of 100 horsepower. It can go from 0-60 mph in about 10 seconds. The car uses a five-speed manual transmission.

The design of the car is derived from the past of the Chrysler Group, notably the muscle car era of the 1960s and 1970s. The Slingshot also features a canvas roof panel. It was based on the smart Roadster Coupé, which was in production from 2003 to 2007.

References

External links 

Slingshot Info from ConceptCarz.com

Dodge concept vehicles
Collection of Walter P. Chrysler Museum